Dagmar Erdman (born 21 August 1965) is a Mexican freestyle swimmer. She competed in two events at the 1980 Summer Olympics.

References

External links
 

1965 births
Living people
Mexican female freestyle swimmers
Olympic swimmers of Mexico
Swimmers at the 1980 Summer Olympics
Place of birth missing (living people)